D'Anthony Batiste (born March 29, 1982) is an American football coach and former player who is the strength and conditioning assistant for the Las Vegas Raiders of the National Football League (NFL). He is a former offensive tackle for the Dallas Cowboys, Carolina Panthers, Atlanta Falcons, Washington Redskins, Denver Broncos and Arizona Cardinals. He also was a member of the Edmonton Eskimos in the Canadian Football League and the Bossier-Shreveport Battle Wings in the AF2. He played college football at the University of Louisiana at Lafayette.

Early years
Batiste attended Marksville High School in his hometown of Marksville, Louisiana, helping his team to three consecutive playoff appearances from 1996 to 1998, while playing tight end and defensive end. He was named all-state, all-district, all-parish and all-region during high school career.

College career
Batiste accepted a football scholarship from the University of Louisiana at Lafayette. He was converted into an offensive guard during his freshman season and had 2 starts. He was a four-year letterman and was named second-team All-Sun Belt selection in his senior season.

Professional career

Arena Football League

Bossier-Shreveport Battle Wings
In 2006, after going undrafted in the 2004 NFL Draft, Batiste signed with the Bossier-Shreveport Battle Wings of the AF2 and played one season.

Canadian Football League

Edmonton Eskimos
In 2006, he signed with the Edmonton Eskimos of the Canadian Football League, but was released after just two preseason games.

Return to the Edmonton Eskimos
On February 4, 2014, he signed as a free agent with the Edmonton Eskimos of the Canadian Football League. He was activated off the one-game injured list in Week 3 to make 15 starts at right tackle. The next year, he had 18 starts at right tackle and received West-Division All-Star honors. In total D'Anthony Batiste played in 56 games for the Eskimos in four seasons.

National Football League

Dallas Cowboys
On June 16, 2006, Batiste was signed by the Cowboys as an undrafted free agent, based on the recommendations of a Cowboys scout that saw him play in the Eskimos' practices. On September 2, he was waived and signed to the team's practice squad two days later.

Carolina Panthers
On October 14, 2006, he was signed by the Carolina Panthers from the Dallas Cowboys' practice squad, but did not see action in any games. He was released on September 1, 2007.

Atlanta Falcons
On September 2, 2007, he was claimed off waivers by the Atlanta Falcons. He started his first career game against Indianapolis Colts and went on to start a total of 4 games during the season. On August 30, 2008, the Falcons waived him during final cuts and signed him to the practice squad two days later.

Washington Redskins
On December 10, 2008, Batiste was signed by the Washington Redskins from the Falcons practice squad. In 2009, he appeared in eight games for the Redskins, before being waived on December 15 when the team signed linebacker Curtis Gatewood.

Denver Broncos
On December 23, 2009, Batiste was signed to the Denver Broncos' practice squad. He was released on October 17, 2010.

Arizona Cardinals
On November 16, 2010, Batiste was signed by the Arizona Cardinals after starting right tackle Brandon Keith suffered an injury. In 2011, he was declared inactive in 12 games and played in 4. In 2012, he started 10 games at left tackle, before being passed on the depth chart by Nate Potter.

Pittsburgh Steelers
On August 3, 2013, Batiste was signed as a free agent by the Pittsburgh Steelers. He was cut on August 25.

Coaching career

Oakland Raiders
On March 1, 2018, Batiste announced his retirement as a player to become the strength and conditioning assistant with the Oakland Raiders of the National Football League (NFL).

Personal life
Batiste worked as a sheriff's deputy in Lafayette, Louisiana, until signing a contract with the Dallas Cowboys of the NFL in 2006. He is of Haitian descent.

References

External links
 Edmonton Eskimos bio 
 For Redskins' Batiste, law of averages finally worked out

1982 births
Living people
People from Marksville, Louisiana
Players of American football from Louisiana
American football offensive guards
American football offensive tackles
Louisiana Ragin' Cajuns football players
Bossier–Shreveport Battle Wings players
Dallas Cowboys players
Carolina Panthers players
Atlanta Falcons players
Washington Redskins players
Denver Broncos players
Arizona Cardinals players
Pittsburgh Steelers players
Edmonton Elks players
American players of Canadian football
Canadian football offensive linemen
American sportspeople of Haitian descent  
Oakland Raiders coaches
Las Vegas Raiders coaches